Mobicents is an Open Source VoIP Platform written in Java to help create, deploy, manage services and applications integrating voice, video and data across a range of IP and legacy communications networks.

In the scope of telecom Next Generation Intelligent Networks (NGIN), Mobicents fits in as a high-performance core engine for Service Delivery Platforms (SDP), IP Multimedia Subsystems (IMS) and Intelligent Core Network (IN).

History

Mobicents LLC, the original company behind Mobicents was created in 2004. It was acquired by Red Hat on June, 2007. After Red Hat sunsetted Mobicents in 2011, TeleStax was created to take over the leadership and Commercial Services around the Mobicents Platform.

See also

 JBoss
 JSLEE
 Signalling System No. 7
 List of SIP software

References

External links
Mobicents

Software using the GNU AGPL license
VoIP software